Großer Alpsee is a lake in Swabia, Bavaria, Germany. At an elevation of 724,63 m, its surface area is 247.3 ha.

External links 
 

Lakes of Bavaria
Protected landscapes in Germany
LGroßer Alpsee